Cyril Collard (19 December 1957, Paris − 5 March 1993, Paris) was a French author, filmmaker, composer, musician and actor. He is known for his unapologetic portrayals of bisexuality and HIV in art, particularly his autobiographical novel and film Les Nuits Fauves (Savage Nights). Openly bisexual, Collard was also one of the first French artists to speak openly about his HIV-positive status.

Early life
Collard was born into a liberal, middle-class family in France. He attended Lycée Hoche in Versailles, and pursued an engineering degree at Institut Industriel du Nord in Villeneuve d'Ascq, later known as École centrale de Lille before deciding to drop out.

Books
 Condamné amour (1987)
 Les Nuits fauves (1989) (trans. Savage Nights by William Rodarmor, 1993)
 L'Ange sauvage (1993)
 L'Animal (1984)

Les Nuits Fauves
The semi-autobiographical Savage Nights (Les Nuits Fauves), finished in 1992, was Collard's first and only feature film. It won four Césars (best editing, best film, best first work, and most promising actress) in 1993. Unfortunately, Collard did not live to accept his award; he had died three days earlier.

Other directing credits
Early in his career, Collard assisted fellow director Maurice Pialat and directed six music videos, as well as several television programs. Among the music videos he directed were those of French-Algerian band Carte de Séjour, whose lead singer Rachid Taha was one of the most famous rock-ethnic musicians in France.
 Les raboteurs, short film after painting by Caillebotte; choreography by Angelin Preljocaj, music by Thierry Lancino (1988).

AIDS
Collard's own experiences with AIDS undoubtedly influenced his work. He died of AIDS-related illness aged 35.

Sources
 Entry in glbtq encyclopedia
 biography at Yahoo! Movies

External links
 
 

1957 births
1993 deaths
AIDS-related deaths in France
École centrale de Lille alumni
Bisexual male actors
French bisexual writers
20th-century French novelists
20th-century French male writers
LGBT composers
LGBT film directors
French LGBT musicians
French LGBT rights activists
Writers from Paris
Lycée Hoche alumni
French LGBT novelists
20th-century French composers
French male novelists
20th-century French LGBT people